The 2015 FIRS Men's Roller Hockey World Cup was the 42nd edition of the Roller Hockey World Cup, organised by the Fédération Internationale de Roller Sports (FIRS). The tournament was held for the first time in France, in the city of La Roche-sur-Yon, from 20 to 27 June 2015.

Qualification

Qualified nations

Venues
The games of the tournament were played in La Roche-sur-Yon.

Squads

Each team submitted a squad of 10 players, including two goalkeepers.

Draw
The 16 teams were divided in four groups, each group with four teams.

First round
The group winners and runners up advanced to the round of 16. The third and fourth places advanced to a series of playoff matches to determine the final standings.

All times are France Summer Time (UTC+02:00).

Group A

Group B

Group C

Group D

Knockout phase

Ninth to sixteenth place playoff

Bracket

Thirteenth to sixteenth place bracket

Ninth to sixteenth place playoff

Thirteenth to sixteenth place playoff

Ninth to twelfth place playoff

Fifteenth place match

Thirteenth place match

Eleventh place match

Ninth place match

Championship playoff

Bracket

Fifth to eighth place bracket

Quarterfinals

Fifth to eighth place playoff

Semifinals

Seventh place match

Fifth place match

Third place match

Final

Final ranking

References

Roller Hockey World Cup
FIRS World Championship
FIRS World Championship
International roller hockey competitions hosted by France